Sa'a is a town located in the Centre Province of Cameroon precisely in the Lekie division.

Sa'a is a small town composed of two main ethic groups: Eton and Manguissa.
Both ethic groups speak Eton and Manguissa languages, which are very similar, and people from the two ethic groups can dialogue without the need of a translator.

A small community of around 50 to 60 people has begun to practice Judaism in Sa'a, but they have not yet formally converted. This group of former Christians is known as Beth Yeshourun. They have begun to collect materials in order to construct a synagogue.

The Cameroonian author Severin Cecile Abega was born in Sa'a.

See also
Communes of Cameroon
History of the Jews in Cameroon

References

Populated places in Centre Region (Cameroon)
Jewish communities
Jews and Judaism in Cameroon